Alois Anderka (25 June 1825, Nové Lublice, Austrian Silesia – 7 April 1886, Moravská Ostrava) was the second mayor of Ostrava in 1864–1873.

Life and career
In 1858, Anderka entered politics. In 1861 he was elected into the local committee and in 1864 was elected mayor.

He cooperated with the occupying Prussian forces during the war between Austrian-Prussian War. He managed to minimise the damage caused by the soldiers. After a peace was concluded, he was decorated by the Emperor.

In 1868 he managed to receive a permit to create a main school in Moravská Ostrava. In 1869 he managed to organise a railroad to be placed between Ostrava and Frýdlant.

Also, a public gaslight was established in 1870, a new city graveyard was opened in 1871.

However, his investive activities caused a deficit on 170,000 gold pieces to be made, resulting in Anderka not being named mayor in 1873. He however remained in communal politics, serving in the local committee, dying on 7 April 1886, due to a lung disease.

He was succeeded by Konstantin Grünwald.

1825 births
1886 deaths
People from Opava District
People from Austrian Silesia
Mayors of Ostrava